RPG Metanoia is a 2010 Filipino 3D computer-animated adventure film produced by Ambient Media, Thaumatrope Animation and Star Cinema. It is the first full length Philippine animated movie presented in 3D. It was an official entry at the 2010 Metro Manila Film Festival. It won the title for 3rd Best Picture, Best Sound Recording and Best Original Theme Song, as well as the Quezon City's Special Citation given for being a Gender Sensitive Movie. The stereoscopy of the film was made by Roadrunner Network, Inc.

Cast
The film features an ensembled cast.
Vhong Navarro as Cel / Sargo
Zaijan Jaranilla as Nico "Nick" "Nicholas" / Zero
Mika Dela Cruz as May "Mayumi" / Cassandra
Jairus Aquino as Bryan "Bry"/ Mang Ernie
Basty Alcances as Mark "Marcus" / Ahdonis
Aaron Junatas as Bobby "Bob" / Sumpak
Jonas Calapatan as Daniel "Dan" "Danny" / K'Mao
Aga Muhlach as Daddy
Eugene Domingo as Mommy
Ketchup Eusebio as Andrew "Andy" / Bossing
Igi Boy Flores as David "Dave" / Sidekick

Production
Luis Suárez stated that the idea for the film came from his time with his nephew during summer (March–May). He asked his nephew what he wanted to do and he said he wanted to play online RPG games, so they went to a café and Luis spent the whole day with his nephew inside it. He then wanted to make a story for him for his nephew to see what he is missing in life. RPG took 5 years to make. Thaumatrope Animation began work in 2006. In 2008, a teaser trailer for the movie (then titled "theRPGmovie") was shown at Level Up's Ragnarok Online event at the World Trade Center. In August 2009, Ambientmedia officially partnered with ABS-CBN. In June 2010, it was announced to be an official entry for the 36th Metro Manila Film Festival. In August 2010, RPG Metanoia's official website was launched.  The Cinema Evaluation Board gave the movie a Grade A. MTRCB gave the film a rated G (General Patronage).

Reception

Critical reception
Julius Edward B. Penascosa of The Philippine Star gave RPG Metanoia a positive review, praising the film for its originality, characters and plot, also noting its depiction of Philippine culture and for not relying on star power as seen with mainstream MMFF entries; the film's voice acting however was criticized, likening the actors' performances to a typical Tagalog dub of an anime series.

Philbert Ortiz Dy of ClickTheCity.com declared the film worthy of comparison to CGI animated features released by Pixar Animation, the studio behind animated films such as Toy Story 3, Up, WALL-E, and Cars, stating: "Regular readers are probably aware of how highly I regard Pixar and their work, and so it should taken as high praise when I say that I would proudly hold RPG Metanoia up against even the best of Pixar. The film is simply extraordinary."

Score
RPG Metanoia the Album is the official soundtrack album of the film published by Star Records. The original film score was composed by Ria Osorio and Gerard Salonga, with the Filharmonika Orchestra performing their composition. The album features APO Hiking Society, Jett Pangan and other well-known Filipino musicians. The theme song of the film "Kaya Mo" was sung by Protein Shake featuring Ney of the band 6Cyclemind and Kean of Callalily; the song is the album's single. An accompanying music video was made for the single.

Accolades

The 2010 Metro Manila Film Festival Awards
RPG Metanoia garnered three awards at the 2010 Metro Manila Film Festival.
 Third Best Picture
 Best Sound Engineering – Ambient Media
 Best Original Theme Song - Ria Osorio and Gerard Salonga - "Kaya Mo" - performed by Protein Shake ft. Ney and Kean

Asia Pacific Screen Award
Nominated for Best Animated Feature at the 2011 Asia Pacific Screen Awards.

FAP Awards
Won Best Sound at the 2011 FAP Awards.

Release
RPG Metanoia was released on DVD on April 26, 2013, by Star Home Video.

References

External links
 

CG Animation News in the Philippines: 'RPG Metanoia' at AnimationInsider.net

Philippine animated drama films
Philippine computer-animated films
2010s Tagalog-language films
Star Cinema films
Star Cinema animated films
2010 animated films
2010 films
2010 3D films
2010 fantasy films
Philippine 3D films
3D animated films
Films about video games